Trioracodon is an extinct genus of Late Jurassic to Early Cretaceous eutriconodont mammal found in North America and the British Isles. It was named in 1928

T. bisulcus is known from the Morrison Formation, where it is present in stratigraphic zone 5, and three other species from the Purbeck Group in Dorset.

See also 
 List of prehistoric mammals
 Paleobiota of the Morrison Formation

References 

Triconodontidae
Berriasian life
Tithonian life
Early Cretaceous mammals of Europe
Cretaceous England
Fossils of England
Morrison mammals
Fossil taxa described in 1928
Taxa named by George Gaylord Simpson
Prehistoric mammal genera